Jin Yan (April 7, 1910 – December 27, 1983), also known by his English name Raymond King, was a Korean-born Chinese actor who gained fame during China's golden age of cinema, based in Shanghai. His acting talents and good looks gained him much popularity in the 1930s. He was dubbed the "Film Emperor" and the "Rudolph Valentino of Shanghai".

Filmography

References

Bibliography

External links 

 Chinese Film Classics: Jin Yan: scholarly website chinesefilmclassics.org contains information about Jin Yan and English translations of his films The Peach Girl, Wild Rose, and The Great Road
The Peach Girl (1931) with English subtitles (Chinese Film Classics website)
Wild Rose (1932) with English subtitles (Chinese Film Classics website)
The Great Road (1934) with English subtitles (Chinese Film Classics website)
The Emperor: Jin Yan

1910 births
1983 deaths
Korean emigrants to China
Chinese male silent film actors
Chinese people of Korean descent
Male actors from Seoul
20th-century Chinese male actors
Male actors of Korean descent
Chinese male film actors
Korean male film actors
20th-century Korean male actors